HMS Vindictive was a British  built at Chatham Dockyard. She was launched on 9 December 1897 and completed in 1899. The vessel participated in the Zeebrugge Raid.

Service history
Vindictive served with the Mediterranean Squadron from 1900,. Attached to the cruised division, she visited Larnaka in June 1902, and took part in combined manoeuvres between the Mediterranean and Channel fleets in the Aegean Sea and off Argostoli in September and October that year.

She was refitted in 1909–10 for service in the 3rd Division of the Home Fleet. In March 1912 she became a tender to the training establishment HMS Vernon. Obsolescent by the outbreak of First World War, in August 1914 she was assigned to the 9th Cruiser Squadron and captured the German merchantmen Schlesien and Slawentzitz on 7 August and 8 September respectively. In 1915 she was stationed on the southeast coast of South America. From 1916 to late 1917 she served in the White Sea.

Early in 1918 she was fitted out for the Zeebrugge Raid. Most of her guns were replaced by howitzers, flame-throwers and mortars. On 23 April 1918 she was in fierce action at Zeebrugge when she went alongside the mole, and her upperworks were badly damaged by gunfire, her Captain, Alfred Carpenter was awarded a Victoria Cross for his actions during the raid. This event was famously painted by Charles de Lacy, the painting hangs in the Britannia Royal Naval College. In addition to her usual complement, she embarked Royal Marine gunners to man the supplementary armament, and a larger raiding party. This comprised two of the three infantry companies of the 4th Battalion, Royal Marine Light Infantry, (their third company was embarked on the Iris), along with two "companies" of seamen raiders commanded by Lieutenant Commander Bryan Fullerton Adams and Lieutenant Arthur Chamberlain ("A" & "B" seamen Companies) respectively.

She was sunk as a blockship at Ostend during the Second Ostend Raid on 10 May 1918. HM Motor Launch 254 picked up 38 survivors of Vindictive's 55 crewmen. The ship's Commander Alfred Godsal perished on board. The wreck was raised on 16 August 1920 and subsequently broken up. The bow section has been preserved in Ostend harbour serving as a memorial. One of Vindictives 7.5-inch howitzers was acquired and preserved by the Imperial War Museum.

References

Publications

External links

 Arrogant Class Second Class Protected Cruiser
 Arrogant Class 2nd Class Cruisers

 

Arrogant-class cruisers
Ships built in Chatham
1897 ships
World War I cruisers of the United Kingdom
World War I shipwrecks in the North Sea
Maritime incidents in 1918